Pyongyang International House of Culture, also known as the Pyongyang International Cultural Center, is a cultural venue in the Central District of Pyongyang, the capital of North Korea. It was opened on 2 April 1988. It serves as venue for cultural exchange with foreigners.

Venue
Architecturally it combines Korean elements with Soviet architecture. It has a glass facade. The venue has ten floors and the floor space spans .

Rooms dedicated to different cultural activities include art exhibitions, music practice and dance rooms, including a musical instrument room with 160 national instruments from all over the world. The building houses a cinema with the capacity of 120 seats and simultaneous interpreting capabilities. There is also a banquet hall, lounge, tea shop, and offices. The venue also houses the Songhwa Art Studio, and the Organizing Committee of the April Spring Friendship Art Festival.

It houses the Yun Isang Music Institute. The Yun Isang Music Hall, home of the Isang Yun Orchestra, is adjoined to the Pyongyang International House of Culture and houses further cultural facilities. It has a capacity of 600 seats.

The ground floor houses a permanent folkcraft exhibition with tradition Korean crafts by the Korea Minye General Corporation. Over 3,000 kinds of crafts, including Koryo celadon, are on display. Koryo Cultural Tourist Company is also based in the building.

See also
List of theatres in North Korea

References

Works cited

External links
Photos at PBase.com
Photo album of the folkcraft exhibition at Naenara

Indoor arenas in North Korea
Buildings and structures in Pyongyang
1988 establishments in North Korea
Buildings and structures completed in 1988
20th-century architecture in North Korea